Falone Sumaili (born 16 June 2001) is a Burundian footballer who plays as a striker for English club Huddersfield Town and the Burundi women's national team.

Early life
Sumaili was born in the Democratic Republic of the Congo in 2001, however, her family was forced to move to Burundi due to the Second Congo War, before later applying for refugee status in the United Kingdom.

Career
Sumaili began her career in Burundi, where she played for their national team. She moved to England as a refugee and signed for Bradford City in 2018. She scored a hat-trick on the opening day of the 2019–20 season. She later moved to Huddersfield Town in summer 2021.

References

2001 births
Living people
Burundian women's footballers
Women's association football forwards
Bradford City W.F.C. players
Huddersfield Town W.F.C. players
Burundi women's international footballers
Burundian expatriate footballers
Burundian expatriates in the United Kingdom
Expatriate women's footballers in England